Penjuru Crescent is an industrial area in Singapore, bounded by Sungei Jurong, Ayer Rajah Expressway, Penjuru Road, Jalan Buroh, Sungei Pandan, West Coast Highway and West Coast Park, on the peninsula of Tanjong Penjuru. Penjuru Crescent consists of mostly heavy industries and the first two railroad crossings of the Jurong Line.
 
It is accessible through Tower Transit  bus services 78, 79, 285 and SMRT bus service 176 at the southern border although SBS Transit and Tower Transit bus services 30, 51, 143 and 533 are found near the northern border.

Places in Singapore
West Region, Singapore
Western Water Catchment